Carbon Glacier is the fourth studio album by Laura Veirs, released in 2004. The song "Rapture" was heard during the episode "Save Me", from the first season of Grey's Anatomy. On August 7, 2018, it was announced that this album, along with the rest of her releases through Nonesuch, would be reissued for the first time in over ten years on both compact disc and vinyl by Veirs' own record label, Raven Marching Band.

Track listing
"Ether Sings" – 3:44
"Icebound Stream" – 3:04
"Rapture" – 3:06
"Lonely Angel Dust" – 2:38
"The Cloud Room" – 2:52
"Wind Is Blowing Stars" – 2:43
"Shadow Blues" – 4:20
"Anne Bonny Rag" – 2:15
"Snow Camping" – 3:12
"Chimney Sweeping Man" – 3:13
"Salvage A Smile" – 1:52
"Blackened Anchor" – 2:05
"Riptide" – 4:16

See also
Carbon Glacier

References

2004 albums
Laura Veirs albums
Bella Union albums
Nonesuch Records albums
Albums produced by Tucker Martine